was a Japanese variety show hosted by boy band Arashi. It ran from July 2, 2003 to September 28, 2005 on Nippon Television. It aired every Wednesday from 24:50 to 25:20 (JST). D no Arashi! was Arashi's fifth variety show to be aired on NTV, and the second in the CxDxG no Arashi! series.

History
D no Arashi! began in March 2003 as a segment of C no Arashi!, a show where Arashi handled claims on behalf of various companies and organisations in Japan. In the pilot episode, Sakurai reported on a student with all 1's (the lowest score) on his report card. The title of the next series, G no Arashi, was decided by playing darts in the final episode.

In Document Press Arashi, at least one member acted as a reporter and documented various topics. In October 2004, the show was revamped into a "Fool's Curiosity" competition. Arashi split into one MC and two teams of two and tried to pique a special guest's curiosity with unusual experiments, information, and interviews.

Segments
There were eight segments (or corners) in D no Arashi, six of which were member segments. Each member had their own corner on the show where they would lead the other members or introduce a topic.

T no Arashi!
"T no Arashi! (provisional title)" was Sho Sakurai's corner. Sakurai would introduce supposedly unbelievable pictures of things, such as strange bus stops, submitted by viewers of the show.

C no Arashi
Different from their preceding show's concept, the "C" stood for "Contest" instead of "Claim". With themes such as person with the longest tongue or person who is most flexible, the members of Arashi would watch each contestant demonstrate and vote for who they thought was the best.

A no Arashi!
Masaki Aiba's corner. Aiba would propose, often pointless, experiments for the other members of Arashi to try out.

Ni no Arashi!
Kazunari Ninomiya's corner. Ninomiya would pull pranks on the other members.

M no Arashi!
Jun Matsumoto's corner.

O no Arashi!
Satoshi Ohno's corner. Ohno would randomly select two out of 100 photos and draw the two subjects together in one drawing using his own imagination.

Distribution

Home media
VAP released all three series in a collection of two DVDs titled C×D×G no Arashi! Vol.1 and Vol.2. The DVDs peaked at number 3 and number 4 on the Oricon DVD chart.

References

External links
 Official D no Arashi website 

Japanese variety television shows
Nippon TV original programming
2003 Japanese television series debuts
2005 Japanese television series endings